Line 1 of Ningbo Rail Transit is a rapid transit line in Ningbo. It starts from Gaoqiao Town in the west, crosses the central area of Ningbo, and reaches Beilun District in the east. The line started service on May 30, 2014.

Route
Line 1 is the first metro line in Ningbo, stretching in the east-west direction. The Phase 1 section starts as elevated rail from Gaoqiao Town in the west and turns underground when it approaches Haishu District (Wangchun Bridge Station). The tunnel stretches under Zhongshan Road, an east-west arterial road in Ningbo while crossing Fenghua River to enter Yinzhou District. The route travels through the Ningbo East New Town, where Phase 1 terminates (Donghuan South Road Station). Phase 2 starts underground at Donghuan South Road Station and continues as elevated rail after Qiuga East Station. The route travels through rural area of Yinzhou District and Beilun District, before entering Downtown Beilun around Daqi Station. The final section travels to the eastern end of Downtown Beilun before terminating at Xiapu Station. Phase 1, connecting Gaoqiao, Xiapu, Yinzhou, and Ningbo East New Town, started service on May 30, 2014. The rest section from Ningbo East New Town to Beilun District opened on March 19, 2016. The line has 29 stations in total, of which 13 are elevated and the 16 are underground. Starting from March 2016, all 29 stations of Line 1 are operational.

Timeline

Stations

References

01
Railway lines opened in 2014
2014 establishments in China